uXu, or Underground eXperts United was an underground ezine active from 1991 to 2002. It was founded in 1991 by ex-members of the Swedish Hackers Association and was based in Sweden. The group was influenced by a similar movement in the United States known as Cult of the Dead Cow, or CDC.

The group has written and published 617 articles in English and more than 100 in Swedish. The first published articles, which were written in ASCII text, included descriptions of bombs, technology, and the computer scene in Sweden. These themes soon expanded over the years to include journal entries, philosophy, song lyrics, and interviews.

External links
 The complete works of the uXu 1991 - 2002
 Hackers vandalize CIA homepage
 The Electronic Intrusion Threat to National Security and Emergency Preparedness Telecommunications

1991 establishments in Sweden
2002 disestablishments in Sweden
Defunct magazines published in Sweden
Hacker magazines
Hacker groups
Magazines established in 1991
Magazines disestablished in 2002
Computer magazines published in Sweden
Swedish-language magazines
Works about computer hacking
Defunct computer magazines